is an elevated passenger railway station shared by Nankai Electric Railway and West Japan Railway Company (JR West) located  in Izumisano, Osaka, Japan, jointly operated by West Japan Railway Company (JR West) and the private railway operator Nankai Electric Railway. It serves the Rinku Town commercial district located adjacent to Kansai International Airport. With the exception of Kansai Airport Limited Express Haruka services, all train services to and from the airport make stop at this station. It has the Nankai station number "NK31", and the JR West station number "JR-S46".

Lines

Station layout
The station has two island platforms on the third floor, serving two tracks each. Trains for different railway companies stop at adjacent platforms without any physical barriers, but transfers can only be made between the two by using special IC card terminals located within the station. The station is directly connected to the Rinku Gate Tower Building.

Platforms

Adjacent stations

History
The station opened on 15 June 1994.

Station numbering was introduced to the JR West facilities in March 2018 with Rinkū-town being assigned station number JR-R46 for the Kansai Airport Line.

Passenger statistics
In fiscal 2019, the JR West portion of the station was used by an average of 3574 passengers daily (boarding passengers only), while the Nankai portion of the station was used by an average of 6,263 passengers daily during the same period..

Surrounding area
 Rinku Gate Tower Building
 Rinku Premium Outlet shopping mall
 Rinku Pleasure Town Seacle, commercial facility
 Marble Beach

See also
 List of railway stations in Japan

References

External links

  
 Nankai Electric Railway station information 

Railway stations in Japan opened in 1994
Railway stations in Osaka Prefecture
Stations of West Japan Railway Company
Izumisano